The 2016 Rakuten Japan Open Tennis Championships was a men's tennis tournament played on outdoor hard courts. It was the 43rd edition of the Japan Open, and part of the 500 Series of the 2016 ATP World Tour. It was held at the Ariake Coliseum in Tokyo, Japan, from October 3–9, 2016.

Points and prize money

Point distribution

Prize money

Singles main-draw entrants

Seeds

 1 Rankings are as of September 26, 2016.

Other entrants
The following players received wildcards into the singles main draw:
  Taro Daniel
  Yoshihito Nishioka
  Yūichi Sugita

The following player using a protected ranking into the singles main draw:
 Juan Mónaco
 Janko Tipsarević

The following players received entry from the qualifying draw:
  James Duckworth
  Ryan Harrison
  Go Soeda
  Radek Štěpánek

The following player received entry as a lucky loser:
  Donald Young

Withdrawals
Before the tournament
  Nicolás Almagro →replaced by  Donald Young
  Borna Ćorić →replaced by  Jiří Veselý
  Stan Wawrinka →replaced by  Stéphane Robert

During the tournament
  Radek Štěpánek

Retirements
  Feliciano López
  Kei Nishikori

Doubles main-draw entrants

Seeds

 Rankings are as of September 26, 2016

Other entrants
The following pairs received wildcards into the doubles main draw:
  Taro Daniel /  Yasutaka Uchiyama
  Akira Santillan /  Yosuke Watanuki

The following pair received entry from the qualifying draw:
  Nicholas Monroe /  Artem Sitak

Withdrawals
During the tournament
  Radek Štěpánek

Retirements
  Feliciano López

Champions

Singles

  Nick Kyrgios def.  David Goffin, 4−6, 6−3, 7−5

Doubles

  Marcel Granollers /  Marcin Matkowski def.  Raven Klaasen /  Rajeev Ram, 6–2, 7–6(7–4)

References

External links 
 

Rakuten Japan Open Tennis Championships
Japan Open (tennis)
 
Rakuten Japan Open Tennis Championships